and  were Japanese spree killers who killed 11 people, including an infant, on May 25, 1893, a spree known as . The roots of the killings were both emotional and financial. Kido lost his common-law-wife to a man named Torajirō Matsunaga, whose brother, Denjirō, defrauded money from Kido and assaulted him. Along with a pupil named Tani Yagorō, Kido decided to kill Matsunaga's family. They prepared guns and swords and on May 25, 1893, they attacked Denjirō's house and killed four people. They then attacked Denjirō's son's house, killing five people. They also killed his former common-law-wife and her mother. However, they were not able to kill Torajirō Matsunaga. They committed suicide after the murders, and their remains were discovered on June 7. A novel, Kokuhaku by Japanese punk rock singer Kō Machida, was based on their case.

References

Japanese spree killers
Japanese murderers of children
Murder–suicides in Japan
Criminal duos
Suicides in Japan
1850s births
Joint suicides
1893 deaths
Japanese mass murderers
Mass murder in Japan
Family murders
1890s suicides